Stelis cyathiflora is a species of orchid plant native to Peru.

References 

cyathiflora
Flora of Peru